Sensuroimaton Versio is the sixth studio album by Finnish singer Anna Abreu, released in Finland by Warner Bros. Records on September 9, 2016. The album was preceded by five singles and marked Abreu's first Finnish-language studio album, following her fifth English-language album V.

The album debuted and peaked at number 3 on the Finnish Albums Chart, becoming Abreu's sixth consecutive Top 5 album and her highest entry since her 2011 album Rush.

Commercial performance
Sensuroimaton Versio debuted and peaked at number three on the Finnish Top 50 Albums Chart. To date it has sold over 10,000 copies and been certified gold by the IFPI.

Track listing

Promotion
{{infobox concert|
|concert_tour_name = Sensuroimaton Versio Tour
|image             = 
|image_size        = 
|image_caption     = 
|artist = Anna Abreu
|album = 'Sensuroimaton Versio|start_date = October 1, 2016
|end_date =  December 10, 2016
|number_of_legs = 1
|number_of_shows = 19 in Finland
| last_tour      = V Tour(2014) 
| this_tour      = Sensuroimaton Versio Tour(2016) 
| next_tour      = TBA
}}

In late 2016, Abreu promoted her sixth album with the Sensuroimaton Versio'' Tour throughout Finland.

Tour dates

References

2014 albums
Anna Abreu albums